Mosan is a hypothetical language family consisting of the Salishan, Wakashan, and Chimakuan languages of the Pacific Northwest region of North America. It was proposed by Edward Sapir in 1929 in the Encyclopædia Britannica. Little evidence has been adduced in favor of such a grouping, no progress has been made in reconstructing it, and it is now thought to reflect a language area rather than a genetic relationship. The term persists outside academic linguistic literature because of Sapir's stature.

An automated computational analysis (ASJP 4) by Müller et al. (2013) found lexical similarities between Salishan and Chimakuan. Wakashan was not included. However, since the analysis was automatically generated, the grouping could be either due to mutual lexical borrowing or genetic inheritance.

External relationships
Michael Fortescue suggested in 1998 that Nivkh might be related to the Mosan languages of North America. Later, in 2011, he argued that Nivkh, which he referred to as an "isolated Amuric language", was related to the Chukotko-Kamchatkan languages, forming a Chukotko-Kamchatkan–Amuric language family. However, Glottolog considers the evidence to be "insufficient".

In 2015, Sergei Nikolaev argued in two papers for a systematic relationship between Nivkh and the Algic languages of North America, and a more distant relationship between these two together and the Wakashan languages of coastal British Columbia.

See also
Algonquian–Wakashan languages (Almosan)

References

Further reading

 Campbell, Lyle. (1997). American Indian languages: The historical linguistics of Native America. New York: Oxford University Press. .
 Beck, David (1997). Mosan III: a problem of remote common proximity. International Conference on Salish (and Neighbo(u)ring) Languages.

 
Proposed language families
Algonquian–Wakashan languages
Northwest Coast Sprachbund (North America)